Online search is the process of interactively searching for and retrieving requested information via a computer from databases that are online. Interactive searches became possible in the 1980s with the advent of faster databases and smart terminals. In contrast, computerized batch searching was prevalent in the 1960s and 1970s. Today, searches through web search engines constitute the majority of online searches. 

Online searches often supplement reference transactions.

References

Internet terminology
Information retrieval genres